V Chart Awards is a music award ceremony organised by the largest independent music website in China, YinYueTai. YinYueTai is the counterpart to Billboard in United States and Gaon Charts in Korea. It aims to build a much fairer, more professional and influential music industry in China and the award to reflect the Chinese fans' love of music from different regions of the world.

Categories 
The beginning of the awards introduced the data category, jury category and the voting category. After the third ceremony, the award added on singer category, composition category and popular category while a techniques category was introduced in the fourth ceremony.

Shortlisted Criteria 
1. The "data category" award nominees are artists who released an official MV in between January 1 to December 31 and the artist must have rankings in the chart throughout the whole year.

2. "The Most Popular Artists" series (voting category) of shortlisted nominees are the top 30 artists in the TOP100 list in all five regions.

3. "Artist Award" series nominees (singer category) are artists who released music-related work(s) in between January 1 to December 31. In addition to the results of the MV chart, the awards will be based on a combination of criteria: the standard of the released album, participation in offline activities, performances, film and television, hosting and the results that accompanies.

4. "Composition Category" award nominees are artists who released an official MV from January 1 to December 31 and the artist must have the most #1 wins in the chart throughout the whole year. "MV Awards" are based on MV production standards, word of mouth, shooting, conception, production and list of achievements to determine the winning entries.

5. "Album of The Year" is determined according to the annual album sales data ranking on the Yin Yue Shopping Mall. Shortlisted nominees are the top 10 albums on the data ranking.

6. "Jury Category" winner will have their music-related work(s) scrutinised by the senior musicians combined with the results drawn from the V Chart.

V Chart Awards (by year)

Merit categories

Data category

 Top Male Artist: since 2013
 Top Female Artist: since 2013
 Top Group: since 2013
 Top New Artist: since 2013

Voting Category

 Favorite Artist: since 2013

Other Categories

 (Includes Jury category, composition category, popular category and techniques category)

 Album of the Year: since 2013
 Best Singer Songwriter: since 2013
 Best Collaboration: since 2013
 All-round Artist Of The Year: since 2013
 Best Stage Performance: since 2015
 Recommended Artist Of Yinyue Tai: since 2015
 Best Director of the Year: since 2015
 Top Promising Artist: since 2014
 Top Promising Group: since 2014
 Breakthrough Male Artist Of The Year: since 2013
 Breakthrough Female Artist Of The Year: since 2013
 Hot Trend Male Artist Of The Year: since 2013
 Hot Trend Female Artist Of The Year: since 2013
 Most Popular Artist Of the Night: since 2016
 Most Popular Group Of the Night: since 2016

Defunct Awards
 Best Producer: until 2016
 Best Duet: until 2015
 Top Social Singer: until 2015
 OST of the Year: until 2015
 Indie Artist Of The Year: 2016 only
 Most Influential Artist of Asia: 2016 only
 Live Popular Artist: 2015 only
 Vanguard Musician of the Year: 2015 only

References 

 
YinYueTai
Chinese music awards
Chinese music industry
Asian music awards
Annual events in China